Vengerovsky District is an administrative and municipal district (raion), one of the thirty in Novosibirsk Oblast, Russia. It is located in the west of the oblast. Its administrative center is the rural locality (a selo) of Vengerovo. As of the 2010 Census, the total population of the district was 20,446, with the population of Vengerovo accounting for 34.4% of that number.

Notable residents 

Grigory Eliseev (1821–1891), journalist, editor, and publisher, born in the village of Spasskoe

References

Notes

Sources

Districts of Novosibirsk Oblast